The scene descriptions and line counts below are taken from the open content PlayShakespeare.com edition of Shakespeare's plays.

All's Well That Ends Well

Antony and Cleopatra

As You Like It

The Comedy of Errors

Coriolanus

Cymbeline

Double Falsehood

Edward III

Hamlet

Henry IV, Part 1

Henry IV, Part 2

Henry V

Henry VI, Part 1

Henry VI, Part 2

Henry VI, Part 3

Henry VIII

King John

Julius Caesar

King Lear

Love's Labour's Lost

Macbeth

Measure for Measure

The Merchant of Venice

The Merry Wives of Windsor

A Midsummer Night's Dream

Much Ado About Nothing

Othello

Pericles, Prince of Tyre

King Richard II

Richard III

Romeo and Juliet

The Taming of the Shrew

The Tempest 

Some of these synopses, in edited form, are from The Annotated Shakespeare for Colleges and Schools by Rev. David Bain, 1892.

Sir Thomas More

Timon of Athens

Titus Andronicus

Troilus and Cressida

Twelfth Night

The Two Gentlemen of Verona

The Two Noble Kinsmen

The Winter's Tale

References

Shakespeare-related lists
Shakespearean scenes